Washington Executive Airport , also known as Washington Executive Airpark or Hyde Field, was a public use general aviation airport located  southwest of the central business district (CBD) of Clinton, in Prince George's County, Maryland, United States.  The airport ceased operations on November 30, 2022 following a bankruptcy sale of the property. 

Hyde Field was one of the "Maryland 3" airports located within the Washington, D.C. Flight Restricted Zone (FRZ), so it was subject to the Special Flight Rules Area (SFRA) restrictions imposed by the FAA after the September 11 attacks.

History 
Hyde opened in 1934 as a training field for United States Army aviators.

Due to the onerous SFRA restrictions leading to declining revenues at the airport, in 2008 there were plans to shut it down and redevelop the land. However, the airport remained open and operational until 2022.

Pending Closure 
On October 31, 2022, airport tenants were notified that the field was closing and were given until November 30, 2022, to remove their aircraft and any belongings after which the new owners will repurpose the property for housing development.

Facilities 

 Runway 5/23:  x , surface: asphalt

References

External links 
Hyde Field (official website)

Airport Master Record (FAA Form 5010), also available as a printable form (PDF)

Airports in Maryland
Transportation buildings and structures in Prince George's County, Maryland
Airports established in 1934
1934 establishments in Maryland
Airports in the Washington metropolitan area